Mooney Mooney Creek is a suburb of the Central Coast region of New South Wales, Australia, located  north of Sydney along both sides of the river after which it is named. It is part of the  local government area.

Almost all of the suburb's land area is part of the Brisbane Water National Park, and the Pacific Motorway and Pacific Highway pass through the west and north of the suburb.

See also
 Mooney Mooney Bridge

References

Suburbs of the Central Coast (New South Wales)
Hawkesbury River